Philip the Upright (14 July 1448 – 28 February 1508) was an Elector Palatine of the Rhine from the house of Wittelsbach from 1476 to 1508.

Biography
He was the only son of Louis IV, Count Palatine of the Rhine and his wife Margaret of Savoy. At the age of one year Philip fell under the guardianship of his uncle Frederick, who later adopted him. In 1474, he married Margaret of Bavaria-Landshut, the daughter of Louis IX, Duke of Bavaria and by virtue of the marriage received the Upper Palatinate. After the death of his adoptive father in 1476, he became the Elector. In 1499 he inherited the possessions of the branches of Palatinate-Mosbach and Palatinate-Neumarkt. Philip lost the Landshut War of Succession in 1504 to Albert IV, Duke of Bavaria.

In 1481 Philip invited Johann von Dalberg into the Ruprecht Karl University of Heidelberg.

Family and children
Philip married Margaret of Bavaria (7 November 1456 – 25 January 1501) on 21 February 1474. They had the following children:
 Louis (2 July 1478 – 16 March 1544).
 Philip (5 July 1480 – 5 January 1541), Bishop of Freising (1498–1541) and of Naumburg (1517–41).
 Ruprecht (14 May 1481 – 20 August 1504), Bishop of Freising (1495–1498), father of Otto Henry, Elector Palatine.
 Frederick (9 December 1482 – 26 February 1556).
 Elisabeth (16 November 1483 – 24 June 1522), married:
 in 1498 to William III, Landgrave of Hesse-Marburg;
 in 1503 to Philip I, Margrave of Baden.
 Georg (10 February 1486 – 27 September 1529), Bishop of Speyer (1515–1529).
 Henry (15 February 1487 – 3 January 1552), Bishop of Utrecht (1523–1529) and of Freising (1541–1552), Bishop of Worms (1523–1552).
 John III (7 May 1488 – 3 February 1538), Bishop of Regensburg (1507–1538).
 Amalie (25 July 1490 – 6 January 1524), married in 1513 to George I, Duke of Pomerania-Wolgast.
 Barbara (28 August 1491 – 15 August 1505).
 Helena (9 February 1493 – 4 August 1524), married in 1513 to Henry V, Duke of Mecklenburg-Schwerin.
 Wolfgang (31 October 1494 – 2 April 1558).
 Otto Henry (6 May 1496 – 31 May 1496).
 Catherine (14 October 1499 – 16 January 1526).

Ancestors

External links

 genealogie-mittelalter.de

1448 births
1508 deaths
Nobility from Heidelberg
House of Wittelsbach
Prince-electors of the Palatinate
Burials at the Church of the Holy Spirit, Heidelberg